Ummat can have several meanings:-

 Ummah (Arabic: أمة) word meaning community or nation.